Erminia is a character in Gerusalemme liberata by Torquato Tasso.

Erminia may also refer to:

 Erminia (given name), list of people with this name
 705 Erminia, an asteroid 
 Erminia, a common misspelling of the tortrix moth genus Erminea, nowadays considered a junior synonym of Cydia
 "Erminia" (song), a song by Juan Crisóstomo Arriaga
 Erminia, a serenade by Scarlatti

See also
 Erminia and the Shepherds, a painting by Guercino based on Tasso's poem